Prince Regent (foaled 1935) was an Irish Thoroughbred racehorse who won the 1946 Cheltenham Gold Cup. He was the dominant steeplechaser in Ireland during World War II with his wins including the Irish Grand National in 1942. After the war he was able to compete in the major British chases and won the Cheltenham Gold Cup in 1946. He finished third when favourite for the 1946 Grand National and fourth in the race in 1947, carrying top weight on both occasions. He continued to race until the age of fourteen, retiring in 1949.

Background
Prince Regent was a large bay gelding, standing 17 hands high in maturity, bred in Ireland by A H Mawell. He was sired by My Prince, a high-class performer on the flat who became a very successful sire of National Hunt horses. His other offspring included the Cheltenham Gold Cup winner Easter Hero and the Grand National winners Reynoldstown, Gregalach and Royal Mail. Prince Regent's dam, Nemaea, was a full-sister to Diomedes, an outstanding sprinter who won the Nunthorpe Stakes, King's Stand Stakes and two July Cups.

As a yearling, Prince Regent was sold at the Goff's sale and returned to the auction ring a year later when he was bought for £407 by Harry Bonner acting on behalf of James Voase "Jimmy" Rank (the older brother of the film producer J. Arthur Rank). The horse was broken in by Tom Dreaper in Ireland, after which it was intended that he would be sent into training with Gwyn Evans at Druid's Lodge in Wiltshire. When Evans died, Prince Regent was sent back to Dreaper, a livestock farmer who trained racehorses at Greenogue in County Dublin. Rank wanted Dreaper to train for him in England but Dreaper refused to relocate.

Racing career

Early career in Ireland
Prince Regent began his racing career in bumpers, winning at the third attempt as a five-year-old in 1940. He then switched to racing over obstacles and developed into a top class steeplechaser over the next two years. In 1942 he won three chases under big weights and was assigned 175 pounds for the Irish Grand National at Fairyhouse. Ridden by Timmy Hyde, he won from Dorothy Paget's Golden Jack. A whole generation of fine Irish chasers, normally exported, ran against each other often in handicaps for small prize money. Prince Regent won 12 races in Ireland between 1941 and 1945. It has been reported that "it is necessary to appreciate this in order to assimilate that Arkle had to win two Cheltenham Gold Cups before Tom Dreaper conceded that "he might be the Prince's equal""

Following the suspension of National Hunt racing in Britain, many leading British chasers including Roman Hackle and Medoc II were relocated to Ireland. Prince Regent however, maintained his position as the best jumper in the country, winning several major races and finishing second under top weight in the Irish Grand Nationals of 1943 and 1944. Plans to send the horse to race in England in the spring of 1945 were abandoned when he developed a warble on his back.

1945/46 National Hunt season
Prince Regent returned in November 1945 and was beaten a head when attempting to concede 42 pounds to Roman Hackle at Leopardstown Racecourse. He then made his first appearance in England and won the Bradford Chase at Wetherby at odds of 1/10. On 14 March 1946 the eleven-year-old Prince Regent contested the Cheltenham Gold Cup and started the 4/7 favourite. The best of his five opponents appeared to be Red April (third in the Champion Hurdle) and the novice Poor Flame, whilst the other runners were the outsiders Elsich, Jalgreya and African Collection. Elsich took the early lead before falling and leaving Prince Regent in front. The challengers steadily dropped away and by the second last only Poor Flame was in any position to test the favourite. The novice made a bad jumping error and Prince Regent drew away to win by five lengths, with another four lengths back to Red April in third. The first Grand National for six years was run at Aintree Racecourse on 5 April and Prince Regent was made the 3/1 favourite despite top weight of 173 pounds in a race attracted a crown estimated at 400,000. He survived several jumping errors before taking the lead on the second circuit and, despite being repeatedly hampered by loose horses, reached the final fence with a clear lead. He tired on the run-in however and was beaten into third place by Lovely Cottage and Jack Finlay. At the same meeting, Prince Regent won the Champion Chase over two miles and seven furlongs.

Later career
The winter of 1946/47 was exceptionally severe and many National Hunt fixtures, including the Cheltenham Festival, were either cancelled or postponed. When the weather eased Prince Regent returned to England for a second attempt at the Grand National for which he was assigned a weight of 175 pounds and again started favourite, this time at odds of 8/1. In a race run in atrocious conditions with heavy ground and thick fog Prince Regent finished fourth of the fifty-seven runners behind the 100/1 outsider Caughoo. He returned to Aintree in November 1947 and won the Becher Chase. In the 1948/49 season Rank brought Prince Regent to England for his final season. He won the Bibury Chase at Cheltenham in December but was retired after falling in a race at Lingfield Park in 1949.

Assessment and honours
In their book, A Century of Champions, based on the Timeform rating system, John Randall and Tony Morris rated Prince Regent a "great" Gold Cup winner and the tenth best steeplechaser trained in Britain or Ireland in the 20th century. They described his 1946 Grand National performance as one of the best in the race's history. Prince Regent's name is remembered in Prince Regent Avenue, a residential street in Cheltenham.

Pedigree

References 

1935 racehorse births
Racehorses bred in Ireland
Racehorses trained in Ireland
Thoroughbred family 5-f
Godolphin Arabian sire line
Cheltenham Gold Cup winners
Cheltenham Festival winners
National Hunt racehorses